The Sophia Awards are the Portuguese cinematographic and film awards, assigned annually, which aim to recognize the best national productions. Its name was chosen in honor of the Portuguese poet and writer Sophia de Mello Breyner Andersen and also because "Sophia" is a classic Greek name which means "wisdom" .

History 
The awards were instituted in 2012, a year after the creation of the Portuguese Academy of Motion Picture Arts and Sciences. The president, Paulo Trancoso, said that the main idea was to create a form of recognizing and congratulate the excellence in cinema in the country having in mind other annual awards in Europe like the Goya Awards in Spain or the César Awards in France.

The first edition took place on November 26, 2012, at the Cinemateca Portuguesa, where three Career Awards were given to the film director and producer António da Cunha Teles, the filmmaker António de Macedo and the actress Isabel Ruth.

List of ceremonies

Categories
The Sophia Awards are awarded in 22 categories, with a maximum of four candidates for each. 

As of 2021:

 Best Film
 Best Director
 Best Original Screenplay
 Best Actor
 Best Actress
 Best Supporting Actor
 Best Supporting Actress
 Best Documentary Feature
 Best Cinematography
 Best Editing
 Best Sound
 Best Original Score
 Best Art Direction
 Best Characterization/Special Effects
 Best Costume Design
 Best Makeup and Hairstyling
 Best Series/Television film
 Best Live Action Short Film
 Best Documentary Short Film
 Best Animated Short Film
 Best Trailer
 Best Poster

The following are also assigned:

 Sophia Art and Technique Award
 Sophia Career Award
 Sophia Student Award
  The Sophia Student Award stands out as it gets awarded after a submission and selection phase. The main goal is to encourage future cineasts and their education institutions to share their work.

References

External links

 

Portuguese film awards
Annual events in Portugal